Nodari Avtandilovich Kalichava (born 24 November 2000) is a Russian football player of Georgian descent. He plays for Georgian club FC Samgurali Tsqaltubo.

Club career
He made his debut in the Russian Football National League for FC Zenit-2 Saint Petersburg on 17 March 2019 in a game against FC Fakel Voronezh.

References

External links
 Profile by Russian Football National League

2000 births
Footballers from Saint Petersburg
Russian people of Georgian descent
Living people
Russian footballers
Association football goalkeepers
FC Zenit-2 Saint Petersburg players
FC Irtysh Omsk players
FC Volga Ulyanovsk players
FC Samgurali Tskaltubo players
Russian First League players
Russian Second League players
Russian expatriate footballers
Expatriate footballers in Georgia (country)
Russian expatriate sportspeople in Georgia (country)